Sadová is a municipality and village in Hradec Králové District in the Hradec Králové Region of the Czech Republic. It has about 300 inhabitants.

Etymology
The name is derived from the Czech word sad, i.e. "orchard".

Geography
It lies in a flat agricultural landscape of the East Elbe Table. It is situated on the right bank of the Bystřice River.

History

The first written mention of Sadová is from 1086, when it was owned by the St. George's Convent in Prague. Between 128 and 1400, the village was owned by various lower nobles and by the Teutonic Order in Hradec Králové. Until 1420, it was again property of the St. George's Convent. In 1448, Sadová was acquired by the Knights of Sloupno, and they became known as the Knights of Sadovský of Sloupno. After the Battle of White Mountain in 1620, their properties were confiscated and Sadová was bought by Albrecht von Wallenstein.

Albrecht von Wallenstein owned Sadová only one year, then he exchanged the village with Maria Magdalena Trčková for other properties. She bequeathed the village to Adam Erdmann Trčka von Lípa, but he was murdered in 1636, and Sadová was gifted to General Lieutenant Matthias Gallas. In the late 1640s, Sadová was acquired by marriage by the House of Schaffgotsch. They ruled the village until 1788, when they had to sell it due to debts. From 1788 to 1829 it was owned by Lords of Gränzenstein, and from 1829 by the Harrach family.

On 3 July 1866, the area around Sadová became the scene of the sanguinary Battle of Königgrätz, also known as the Battle of Sadowa, the decisive combat of the Austro-Prussian War. There are many monuments and graves in and around Sadová commemorating this event.

Despite France being neutral in that war, the French public resented the Prussian victory and demanded "Revanche pour Sadova" (Revenge for Sadowa), which was one factor leading to the Franco-Prussian War of 1870.

Transport
Sadová lies on the expressway and on the railway line from Hradec Králové to Jičín.

References

External links

1866 War Museum – Museum of Eastern Bohemia in Hradec Králové

Villages in Hradec Králové District